The Alia2 Foundation is a Spanish nonprofit organization whose goal is to stop internet child grooming to prevent child abduction and rape. Alia2 works together with other public entities to combat this threat by educating parents and children how to use new technologies responsibly.

See also
 Child grooming
 Cyberbullying
 Cyberstalking
 Pedophilia

References

External links 
 Official website

Foundations based in Spain
Child abuse